Aakhri Sanghursh is a Hindi action film of Bollywood directed by Narendra Bedi and produced by G. M. Patel. The film stars Vijayendra Ghatge, Kajal Kiran, Mukesh Khanna in the key roles. This film was made in 1982 and was ready to be released in 1986, but due to some unknown reasons, the film was finally released in 1997 in the banner of G. M. Productions and Jawahar Picture Palace.

Plot
The story of the movie is about Shakti Singh, a poor hardworking boiler mechanic, lives a happy life with his wife Seeta, mother and two sons Arjun and Vijay. Shakti always falsely fights against injustice. Once he is falsely implicated for this, for which he have to go to jail. Seeta is forced to be a courtesan in liew of money, owed by Shekhar, so misunderstanding creates between Shakti and Seeta, being insulted Seeta leaves 
house. Shakti realises his mistakes but it's too late, soon he takes the path of crime and soon becomes an underworld don. After some years, now his two sons Arjun is married to Kajal and Vijay to Aarti. Kajal does not like his father-in-law as he is in illegal activities, Arjun is self-employed, Vijay has some bad habits for which he often quarrels with his father. Shakti has enemies and traitors on his business. The situation worsens when Vijay has been killed. Now what will he manage the situation forms the climax.

Cast
 Vijayendra Ghatge as Arjun Singh
 Kajal Kiran as Kajal Singh
 Mukesh Khanna as Shakti Singh
 Shakti Kapoor as Vijay Singh
 Jeevan as Lawyer
 Helen as Meena
 Heena Kausar as Aarti Singh
 Sarika as Seeta Singh
 Viju Khote as Shankar
 Dinesh Thakur as Dinesh
 Pinchoo Kapoor as Mr. Patel
 Kamal Kapoor as Patel's Partner
 Om Shivpuri as Patel's Partner
 Narendranath as Shekhar
 Sudhir as Baggu
 Kalpana Iyer as Baggu's Girlfriend

Soundtrack

References

External links

1997 films
1990s Hindi-language films
Films directed by Narendra Bedi
Indian action films
Hindi-language action films
1997 action films